Lottie is an English feminine given name that is a diminutive form of Charlotte or Lieselotte, an alternate form of Lotte, and that is also related to Lisa, Elisa and Elisabeth. Notable people with the name include the following:

Given name

 Lottie Beck (1929–2010), American female baseball player
 Lottie Beebe (born 1953), American educator
 Lottie Blackford, British actress
 Lottie Isbell Blake (1876 - 1976), African-American physician, medical missionary, and educator
 Lottie Briscoe (1883 – 1950), American actress
 Lottie Dexter, Million Jobs campaign leader
 Lottie Gee (1886–1973), American entertainer
 Lottie Estelle Granger (1858–1934), American educator
 Lottie Kimbrough (1900–?), American country blues singer
 Lottie Moggach, English journalist and author
 Lottie Mooney (1902–1982), American artist
 Lottie Mwale (1952–2005), Zambian boxer
 Lottie Holman O'Neill (1878–1967), American politician
 Lottie Phiri (born 1988), Zambian footballer
 Lottie Randolph (1886 or 1887–1968), American agriculturist
 Lottie Louise Riekehof (1920–2020) is an American Sign Language interpreter, author, and a pioneer
 Lottie Ryan (born 1985), Irish TV presenter, radio reporter and dancer
 Lottie Shackelford, American politician
 Lottie Queen Stamper (1907–1987), American Cherokee basket weaver and educator
 Lottie Gertrude Stevenson, née Bevier, known as Trudy Stevenson (1944–2018), Zimbabwean ambassador and politician
 Lottie Williams (1874–1962), American actress

Nickname

 Lottie Alter, whose birthname was Charlotte Alice Alter, (1870s – 1924), American actress
 Lottie Brielmaier, nickname of Clotilde Elizabeth Brielmaier (1867 – 1915), American painter
 Lottie Collins, whose birthname was Charlotte Louisa Collins (1865 – 1910), English singer and dancer
 Lottie Deno, whose presumed real name was Carlotta J. Thompkins, (1844 – 1934), American gambler 
 Lottie Dod, whose full name was Charlotte Dod (1871-1960), English multi-sport athlete, particularly in tennis
 Lottie Ejebrant, whose real name was Gunhild Ejebrant, (born 1944), Swedish actress
 Lottie Gilson born Lydia Deagon, (1862 – 1912), Swiss comedian and vaudeville singer
 Lottie Wilson Jackson, born Charlotte Wilson, (1854 – 1914), American artist 
 Lottie Lyell, whose birthname was Charlotte Edith Cox (1890 – 1925), Australian actress, screenwriter, editor and filmmaker
 Lottie Moon, whose birthname was Charlotte Digges Moon (1840-1912), American Southern Baptist missionary to China
 Lottie Moon, nickname of Cynthia Charlotte Moon (1828–1895) Confederate American Civil War spy
 Lottie Blair Parker, penname of Charlotte Blair Parker (1858 – 1937), American playwright 
 Lottie Pickford, whose birthname was Charlotte Smith (1893–1936), Canadian-born actress and sister of Mary Pickford
 Lottie Rollin, nickname of Charlotte Rollins, American Reconstruction Era activist of The Rollin Sisters
 Lottie Tham, whose full name is Helga Liselott Tham, née Persson, (born 1949), Swedish heiress and businesswoman
 Lottie 'The Body' Graves, whose full name was Lottie Tatum-Graves-Claiborne, (born 1930), American burlesque dancer
 Lottie Venne, whose birthname was Hannah Charlotte Venne, (1852 – 1928), British comedian, actress and singer

Surname
 T. J. Lottie, American singer, member of former R&B group So Plush

Fictional characters
 Lottie, in the British television series The Duchess of Duke Street
 Lottie, an otter character from the Animal Crossing franchise
 Lottie Biggs, protagonist of a teen novel eponymous series written by Hayley Long
 Lottie Chandler, nickname for Charlotte Chandler, All_My_Children character
 Lottie Dolls, created by Arklu Ltd
 Lottie Horn (Lotte Körner in the German language original), character from Erich Kästner's novel Lottie and Lisa
 Lottie Ryan, character from the Australian soap opera Home and Away
 Lottie the Otter, in the Winnie the Pooh novel Return to the Hundred Acre Wood
Lottie Matthews. one of the teen plane crash survivors in the Showtime (TV network) TV series Yellowjackets (TV series)

See also

Lotte (name)
Lotti (given name)

Notes

English feminine given names